Wymiarki  (formerly German Wiesau) is a village in Żagań County, Lubusz Voivodeship, in western Poland. It is the seat of the gmina (administrative district) called Gmina Wymiarki.

The village has a population of 1,300.
 Otwiernica river

References

Wymiarki